John Cameron was a Scottish professional footballer, who played for Huddersfield Town. He was killed in action in the Great War sometime during 1916.

References

Year of birth missing
1916 deaths
People from Sutherland
Scottish footballers
Association football forwards
English Football League players
Huddersfield Town A.F.C. players
Sportspeople from Highland (council area)
Date of death missing
British Army personnel of World War I
British military personnel killed in World War I